Sakamkam is a wadi and settlement in Fujairah, United Arab Emirates (UAE). Sakamkam Fort is located here.

The area is located some 7 km north of the city of Fujairah. Archaeological finds here have been particularly rich, with some 126 burials located, including oval, circular and the characteristic Wadi Suq period figure-of-eight burial. A number of Late Islamic period ceramics have also been found in the wadi, dating from the 15th-18th centuries.

Surveys of the burials and settlement remains in the wadi started in the 1980s, by a Swiss team. Further surveys were requested in 2001 and 2002 by utility companies installing infrastructure and were carried out by the Abu Dhabi Islands Archaeological Survey, ADIAS.

References 

Populated places in the Emirate of Fujairah